is a railway station on the Keisei Oshiage Line in Katsushika, Tokyo, Japan, operated by the private railway operator Keisei Electric Railway.

Lines

Station layout
The station has two side platforms serving two tracks.

Platforms

History
Keisei Tateishi station opened on 3 November 1912.

Station numbering was introduced to all Keisei Line stations on 17 July 2010; Keisei Tateishi was assigned station number KS49.

See also
 List of railway stations in Japan

Surrounding area
 Katsushika Ward Office

References

Railway stations in Tokyo
Katsushika
Railway stations in Japan opened in 1912